Reg Collier (5 October 1908 – 9 June 1976) was  a former Australian rules footballer who played with Footscray in the Victorian Football League (VFL).

Notes

External links 
		

1908 births
1976 deaths
Australian rules footballers from Victoria (Australia)
Western Bulldogs players
Eaglehawk Football Club players